Clifford Hugh Dowker (March 2, 1912 – October 14, 1982) was a topologist known for his work in point-set topology and also for his contributions in category theory, sheaf theory and knot theory.

Biography
Clifford Hugh Dowker grew up on a small farm in Western Ontario, Canada. He excelled in mathematics and was paid to teach his math teacher math at his secondary school. He was awarded a scholarship at Western Ontario University, where he got his B.S. in 1933. He wanted to pursue a career as a teacher, but he was persuaded to continue with his education because of his extraordinary mathematical talent. He earned his M.A. from the University of Toronto in 1936 and his Ph.D. from Princeton University in 1938. His dissertation Mapping theorems in non-compact spaces was written under the supervision of Solomon Lefschetz and was published (with additions) in 1947 in the American Journal of Mathematics. After earning his doctorate, Dowker became an instructor at the Western Ontario University for a year. The next year, he worked as an assistant back at Princeton under John von Neumann. During World War II, he worked for the U.S. Air Force, calculating the trajectories of projectiles. He married Yael Naim in 1944. After the war, he was appointed associate professor at the Tufts University. Because of Senator Joseph McCarthy's red scare, he decided to take his family to England shortly thereafter, where he was appointed Reader in applied mathematics at Birkbeck College in 1951. In 1962 he was granted a personal chair, until he retired in 1979. The last years of his life were marked by a long illness, yet he continued working, developing Dowker notation in the weeks before his death.

Work
Dowker showed that Čech and Vietoris homology groups coincide, as do the Čech cohomology and Alexander cohomology groups. Along with Morwen Thistlethwaite, he developed Dowker notation, a simple way of describing knots, suitable for computers.

His most highly cited article is his 1951 paper in which he introduced the concept of countably paracompact spaces.
Dowker conjectured that so-called Dowker spaces could not exist, a conjecture ultimately proven false in a famous 1971 paper by Mary Ellen Rudin.

See also
Dowker notation
Dowker space
Čech cohomology
Morwen Thistlethwaite
Sheaf theory

References

External links

Topologists
1982 deaths
1912 births
University of Western Ontario alumni
20th-century Canadian mathematicians
Canadian emigrants to the United States